The Magnificent Moodies is the 1965 debut album by British rock band The Moody Blues, released on Decca Records. It is the only album by the original line-up of Denny Laine (guitar/vocals), Clint Warwick (bass/vocals), Mike Pinder (keyboards/vocals), Ray Thomas (flute/harmonica/percussion/vocals) and Graeme Edge (drums). Lead vocals were shared by Laine, Pinder and Thomas. The album is a mix of rhythm and blues covers, including "Go Now" which had been a Number 1 hit single for the band earlier that year, and original songs by Laine and Pinder which show more of a Merseybeat influence. Also included is a cover of the George and Ira Gershwin standard "It Ain't Necessarily So". The album was produced by Denny Cordell, with the exception of "Go Now" which was produced by Alex Wharton. In-between "Go Now" and The Magnificent Moodies the band had released two more singles, "I Don't Want to Go On Without You" and "From the Bottom of My Heart", neither of which were included on the album. For the American and Canadian release on London Records, with the title Go Now: The Moody Blues #1, four songs were replaced with those two preceding singles and two B-sides, with a different running order of the tracks.  One of the tracks that was replaced, "Stop", was released as a single in America and Canada later that year. The American and Canadian album also titled three of the songs incorrectly ("I'll Go Crazy" became "I Go Crazy", "I've Got a Dream" became "I Had a Dream" and "Bye Bye Bird" became "Bye Bye Burd").

Release history

The sleeve notes on the back cover of the original UK release include an (undated) review by Virginia Ironside, music critic of Daily Mail, which concludes, "With the Moody Blues, all you need to write is "MAGNIFICENT" in pink lipstick and leave it at that". A specially-written prose poem by Donovan recommending the band was also included. The Donovan poem was also included on the back cover of the US release.

The band held a launch party for the album, with guests including Marianne Faithfull and George Harrison and Paul McCartney of The Beatles. The Beatles' manager Brian Epstein would become the Moody Blues' manager from September 1965 to October 1966, with the band becoming one of the support acts on The Beatles' 1965 UK tour in December.

The album did not make the Record Retailer/Music Week chart even though it reached number 5 in August 1965 in the New Musical Express album chart. The US album did not make the Billboard chart. It did however reach number 8 in Finland during the spring of 1966.

After the album's release, the original line-up would release three more singles, though Laine and Warwick had left the group by the time the last of these, "Life's Not Life", was released in January 1967. They had both departed by late 1966 and were replaced by Justin Hayward (guitar/vocals) and John Lodge (bass/vocals). The new line-up would release two more singles during 1967, "Fly Me High" in May and "Love and Beauty" in September, before releasing the Moody Blues' second album Days of Future Passed in November that year.

At the height of The Moody Blues' U.S. success in 1970, Deram Records reissued the US version of the album with a new cover and title, In the Beginning (DES-18051). As with the original album, the reissue did not chart.

In 1976, a double compilation album entitled A Dream, which included the entire Magnificent Moodies album as well as single A- and B- sides from the pre-Days of Future Passed 1964 to 1967 period, was issued in much of western Europe, but only available on import in the UK.

In 1985 Intermediate Records reissued the album on vinyl and cassette as Go Now, with a mixture of songs from the original UK and US albums plus some of the non-album singles and B-sides from the 1964 to 1965 period. Decca Records UK first issued The Magnificent Moodies on CD in 1988 with 13 bonus tracks, with mastering by Anthony Hawkins. Repertoire Records issued an abridged version of the CD in 1992 with only 7 bonus tracks. In 2006 the CD was reissued again, this time with 14 bonus tracks including the rare "People Gotta Go" not found on the 1988 Decca version. The CD also included, for the first time, a speed-corrected and undistorted version of "Go Now". The 2006 Repertoire CD was remastered by Eroc, who was the leader of the 1970s German rock band Grobschnitt.

Track listing

British version (The Magnificent Moodies)

All lead vocals by Denny Laine except where noted

American and Canadian version (Go Now: The Moody Blues #1)

50th Anniversary Editions

On 15 December 2014, Esoteric Recordings issued a single CD version (ECLEC 2474) as well as a double CD deluxe version (ECLEC 22473) of the album in honor of the Moody Blues' 50th anniversary and the album's upcoming 50th anniversary. The single CD version and the first CD from the double CD version are identical and both versions utilize the original UK album artwork.

The single CD version and the first CD on the double CD version comprises the complete discography of the original 1964–1966 line-up of the Moody Blues. Tracks 1–12 are the original British Magnificent Moodies album, while the remaining tracks are single A- and B-sides and EP tracks. It also includes a previously unreleased early take of "Go Now".

Tracks 1-7 on the second CD are a previously unreleased demo session on 24 July 1964, tracks 8-19 are from the BBC's Saturday Club radio sessions in 1965, track 20 is a Coca-Cola commercial the band recorded in 1965 and the remaining tracks are previously unreleased 1966 recordings for a proposed second album.

All tracks are in mono except for tracks 21-29 on CD 2, which are in stereo.

Musical personnel

The Moody Blues
Ray Thomas – vocals, percussion, flutes, harmonica
Denny Laine – guitars, harmonica, vocals
Clint Warwick – bass guitar, backing vocals 
Mike Pinder – piano, organ, backing vocals
Graeme Edge – drums, percussion, backing vocals

Additional personnel
Elaine Caswell – percussion

Technical personnel
Denny Cordell - producer
A. Wharton - producer ("Go Now")
Nicholas Wright - photographer (UK issue)
Shirley Scott-James - designer  (UK issue)
Donovan, Virginia Ironside - sleeve notes (UK issue)

Charts

Release history

References

External links
"The Magnificent Moodies" - cover images at discogs.com

1965 debut albums
The Moody Blues albums
Decca Records albums
Albums produced by Denny Cordell